Intermarket segmentation refers to forming segments of consumers who have similar needs and buying behaviour, even though they are located in different countries. It is the process of selecting consumer segments across a range of countries that are targeted with an integrated brand positioning strategy without regard to geographic or national boundaries. The concept was originally coined and defined in a 1991 article published by The Academy of Marketing Science by Dr. Salah S. Hassan, Professor of Global Brand Strategy at George Washington University.

References

External links
Hassan, Salah S. “A Strategic Framework for Identifying and Reaching Inter-market Segments.” K.D. Frankenbreger, et al. (Eds.), World Marketing Congress, Copenhagen, Denmark: Academy of Marketing Science, Vol. V, 1991 pp. 34–37. (Refereed)

Hassan, Salah S. “International Segmentation Options: Getting Away from Conventional Wisdom.” V. Crittenden (Ed.), Developments in Marketing Science, Coral Gables, Florida: Academy of Marketing Science, Vol. XV, 1992 pp. 185–188, with A.C. Samli. (Refereed)

Hassan, Salah S. “Competitive Global Market Segmentation,” Global Marketing Perspectives and Cases, Dryden Press: Fort Worth, Texas, 1994 (with Roger Blackwell).

Hassan, Salah S. “The New Frontiers of Intermarket Segmentation,” Global Marketing Perspectives and Cases, Dryden Press: Fort Worth, Texas, 1994 (with A. Caskun Samli).

Hassan, Salah S. “Identification of Global Consumer Segments: A Behavioral Framework,” Journal of International Consumer Marketing, Vol. 3, No. 2, 1991 pp. 11–28 with L. Katsanis. (Refereed)

Hassan, Salah S. “A Strategic Approach to Understanding and Penetrating Global Segments,” Journal of Database Marketing, Vol. 3, No. 4, 1996 pp. 1–17. (Refereed)

Hassan, Salah S. “Understanding the New Bases for Global Market Segmentation,” Journal of Consumer Marketing, Volume 20, Issue 5, 2003 with Stephen Craft and Wael Kortam. (Refereed) JCM 2004 “Highly Commended” paper award

Hassan, Salah S. “An Examination of Global Market Segmentation Bases and Strategic Positioning Decisions,” International Business & Economics Research Journal, Volume 3, Number 9, September 2004, with Stephen Craft. (Refereed)

Hassan, Salah S. “Linking Global Market Segmentation Decisions with Strategic Positioning Options,” Journal of Consumer Marketing, Volume 22, Number 2, 2005, pp. 81–89, with Stephen Craft. (Refereed)

Hassan, Salah S. and Stephen Craft, "Examining world market segmentation and brand positioning strategies", Journal of Consumer Marketing, Vol. 29 Iss: 5, pp. 344 – 356, 2012.

Market segmentation